Arvaneh (also Romanized as Arvāneh) is a village in Hafdar Rural District, in the Central District of Sorkheh County, Semnan Province, Iran. At the 2006 census, its population was 104, in 43 families. Native language of the people in Arvaneh is Tati.

References 

Populated places in Sorkheh County